Shooting made its debut in the 2019 Parapan American Games.

Participating nations
31 sports shooters from 8 nations qualified to compete.

 (Host country)

Medal table

Medalists

See also
Shooting at the 2019 Pan American Games

References

Parapan
2019 Parapan American Games